CELCIS is the Centre for Excellence for Children's Care and Protection, based at the University of Strathclyde in Glasgow, Scotland and is an organisation that supports the rights and well-being of children and young people and teenagers.

History
CELCIS was established in 2011 with the intention being to provide a holistic approach, rather than serving a specialist part of the professionals who deal with looked after children. It was established to facilitate collaboration and therefore works with a range of organisations to improve outcomes relating to the lives of looked after children in Scotland. The centre was preceded by the Scottish Institute of Residential Child Care (SIRCC), which was a centre of excellence that had been set up in 2000, under the social care leadership of Prof. Joyce Lishman and Chairs Prof Sandy Cameron and latterly Prof Romy Langeland, and was known as the Centre for Excellence for Looked After Children in Scotland until 2019. The revised name - Centre for Excellence for Children’s Care and Protection - reflects the centre's broader remit including supporting national and local child protection work in Scotland.

CELCIS is a leading improvement and innovation centre. It is involved in supporting the implementation of policy into practice. Its work includes generating and analysing research, providing practice guidance, advising local and national government, and with partners, developing new policies and practices to improve the lives of children, young people, their families, carers and the professionals who work to support them. It is the secretariat for Child Protection Committees Scotland, and hosts Scotland’s Virtual School Head Teachers Network.

The Centre is core funded by the Scottish Government. It is hosted by the University of Strathclyde and is an Associated Centre of the Institute for Inspiring Children’s Futures.

The Independent Chair of the Centre is Professor Alexis Jay, Chair of the Independent Inquiry into Child Sexual Abuse - IICSA (England and Wales), Visiting Professor, University of Strathclyde.

CELCIS’s founding Director, Professor Jennifer Davidson was awarded an OBE in 2020 for services to the care and protection of children and young people in Scotland and abroad.

CELCIS also publishes the Scottish Journal for Residential Child Care, an international-facing journal sharing new insight from experience and research from across the world. In 2020, it published a series of ‘Special Features’ to capture in real time practice changes and impact on young people and the workforce caused by the COVID-19 virus around the world.

International Work
CELCIS’s work extends across the world and includes consultancy with international agencies and administrations and commissioned work. This includes delivering three international, free-to-learn, MOOCs (Massive Open Online Courses) commissioned by a taskforce of leading humanitarian and children’s rights organisations including the International Federation of Red Cross and Red Crescent Societies (IFRC), the UNHCR, International Organization for Migration, International Social Service and UNICEF.

In 2012 they were commissioned by the International Social Service to produce the “Moving Forward” handbook which is the official handbook to accompany the implementation of the UN Guidelines on Alternative Care, which aims to embed children’s rights in alternative care provision.

In 2014 they were commissioned by SOS Children's Villages to produce "Drumming Together
for Change: A Child’s Right to Quality Care in Sub-Saharan Africa" report based on a synthesis of eight assessments of the implementation of the Guidelines for the Alternative Care of Children in Benin, Gambia, Kenya, Malawi, Tanzania, Togo, Zambia and Zimbabwe.

See also
 Child Welfare
 Residential care
 Kinship care
 Foster care
 Adoption
 Social work
 Children's rights
 UNCRC

References

External links

 Scottish Journal for Residential Child Care

Social care in Scotland
Welfare agencies
Social work education